The Gulf Club Champions Cup, is a football league tournament for the Arabian Peninsula clubs, it's a tournament for clubs. The 1988 edition was known as the Gulf Cooperation Council Club Tournament.

The tournament doubled up as the qualifying round of the 1988–89 Asian Club Championship. The winners would progress to the ACC's latter stages.

Results

All match were played in Sharjah, United Arab Emirates.

Playoff for 1st place

1 Al-Fanja played only for the GCC Tournament

Winner

 
 

GCC Champions League
Gulf